The 46th Cannes Film Festival was held from 13 to 24 May 1993. The Palme d'Or went to Farewell My Concubine by Chen Kaige and The Piano by Jane Campion.

The festival opened with My Favorite Season, directed by André Téchiné and closed with Toxic Affair, directed by Philomène Esposito. Jeanne Moreau was the mistress of ceremonies.

Juries

Main competition
The following people were appointed as the Jury of the 1993 feature film competition:
Louis Malle (France) Jury President
Claudia Cardinale (Italy)
Inna Churikova (Russia)
Judy Davis (Australia)
Abbas Kiarostami (Iran)
Emir Kusturica (Yugoslavia)
William Lubtchansky (France)
Tom Luddy (USA)
Gary Oldman (UK)
Augusto M. Seabra (Portugal)

Camera d'Or
The following people were appointed as the Jury of the 1993 Camera d'Or:
Micheline Presle (actress) Jury President
Anne De Gasperi (journalist) (France)
Aruna Vasudev (administration)
Attilio D’Onofrio (Italy)
Gabriel Auer (director) (France)
Lia Somogyi (administration) (Hungary)
Rémy Pages (France)
Tony Rayns (UK)

Official selection

In competition - Feature film
The following feature films competed for the Palme d'Or: The Palme d'Or winners have been highlighted.

Un Certain Regard
The following films were selected for the competition of Un Certain Regard:

 The Act in Question (El acto en cuestión) by Alejandro Agresti
 Anchoress by Chris Newby
 Avsporing by Unni Straume
 Bedevil by Tracey Moffatt
 The Bird of Happiness (El Pájaro de la Felicidad) by Pilar Miró
 Bodies, Rest & Motion by Michael Steinberg
 Charlie and the Doctor by Ralph C. Parsons
 Desperate Remedies by Stewart Main, Peter Wells
 The End of the World (O Fim do Mundo) by João Mário Grilo
 Excursion to the Bridge of Friendship by Christina Andreef
 Foreboding (Predchuvstviye) by Valeriu Jereghi
 François Truffaut: Stolen Portraits (Portraits volés) by Serge Toubiana, Michel Pascal
 The Great Pumpkin (Il grande cocomero) by Francesca Archibugi
 Latcho Drom by Tony Gatlif
 Moving (Ohikkoshi) by Shinji Sōmai
 The Music of Chance by Philip Haas
 October (Oktyabr) by Abderrahmane Sissako
 Remote Control by Óskar Jónasson
 The Scent of Green Papaya (Mùi đu đủ xanh) by Tran Anh Hung
 Sonatine by Takeshi Kitano
 Stroke by Mark Sawers
 The Young Girls Turn 25 (Les demoiselles ont eu 25 ans) by Agnès Varda
 Wendemi, l'enfant du bon Dieu by S. Pierre Yameogo
 The Wrong Man by Jim McBride

Films out of competition
The following films were selected to be screened out of competition:

 Cliffhanger by Renny Harlin
 Mad Dog and Glory by John McNaughton
 Madadayo by Akira Kurosawa
 The Baby of Mâcon by Peter Greenaway
 Toxic Affair by Philomène Esposito

Short film competition
The following short films competed for the Short Film Palme d'Or:

 Ævintýri á okkar tímum by Inga Lísa Middleton
 Coffee and Cigarettes III by Jim Jarmusch
 De 4 jaargetijden by Maarten Koopman
 Le goût du fer by Rémi Bernard
 Lenny Minute 1: Lenny Meets the Giant Blue Sheila Doll by Glenn Standring
 Mama Said by Michael Costanza
 Me voy a escapar by Juan Carlos de Llaca
 Robokip by Rudolf Mestdagh
 The Singing Trophy by Grant Lahood
 Der Sortierer by Stephan Puchner

Parallel sections

International Critics' Week
The following films were screened for the 32nd International Critics' Week (32e Semaine de la Critique):

Feature film competition

 Cronos by Guillermo del Toro (Mexico)
 Faut-il aimer Mathilde? by Edwin Baily (France)
 Requiem for a Handsome Bastard (Requiem pour un beau sans cœur) by Robert Morin (Canada)
 Combination Platter by Tony Chan (United States)
 Don't Call Me Frankie by Thomas A. Fucci (United States)
 Abissinia by Francesco Martinotti (Italy)
 Les histoires d’amour finissent mal… en général by Anne Fontaine (France)

Short film competition

 The Debt by Bruno de Almeida (United States)
 Take My Breath Away by Andrew Shea (United States)
 Passage à l’acte by Martin Arnold (Austria)
 Sotto le unghie by Stefano Sollima (Italy)
 Falstaff on the Moon by Robinson Savary (France)
 Springing Lenin by Andrei Nekrasov (United Kingdom)
 Schwarzfahrer by Pepe Danquart (Germany)

Directors' Fortnight
The following films were screened for the 1993 Directors' Fortnight (Quinzaine des Réalizateurs):

 Vaterland by Yevgeniy Lungin
 Sundays on Leave (È pericoloso sporgersi) by Nae Caranfil
 Fausto by Rémy Duchemin
 Grand bonheur by Hervé Le Roux
 Child Murders (Gyekgyilkossagok) by Ildikó Szabó
 I Love a Man in Uniform by David Wellington
 Je m’appelle Victor by Guy Jacques
 La Ardilla Roja by Julio Medem
 La Place d’un autre by René Féret
 The Blue Kite (Lan Fengzeng) by Tian Zhuangzhuang
 Le Mari de Léon by Jean-Pierre Mocky
 Lolo by Francisco Athié
 Menace II Society by Albert Hughes, Allen Hughes
 Mi Vida Loca by Allison Anders
 Me Ivan, You Abraham (Moi Ivan, Toi Abraham) by Yolande Zauberman
 Padma Nadir Majhi by Goutam Ghose
 Pilkkuja ja pikkuhousuja (Lyrics and Lace) by Matti Ijäs
 Ruby in Paradise by Victor Nuñez
 Shadows in a Conflict (Sombras en una batalla) by Mario Camus
 The Snapper by Stephen Frears
 Abraham's Valley (Vale Abraão) by Manoel De Oliveira

Short films

 Comment font les gens by Pascale Bailly
 L'Exposé by Ismaël Ferroukhi
 José Jeannette by Bruno Nicolini
 Le Regard de l’autre by Bruno Rolland
 Qui est-ce qui a éteint la lumière? by Xavier Auradon
 Reste by Marie Vermillard
 Rives by Erick Zonca
 La Vis by Didier Flamand

Awards

Official awards
The following films and people received the 1993 Official selection awards:
Palme d'Or: 
Farewell My Concubine by Chen Kaige
The Piano by Jane Campion
Grand Prize of the Jury: Faraway, So Close! by Wim Wenders
Best Director: Mike Leigh for Naked
Best Actress: Holly Hunter for The Piano
Best Actor: David Thewlis for Naked
Jury Prize:
Raining Stones by Ken Loach
The Puppetmaster by Hou Hsiao-hsien
Golden Camera
Caméra d'Or: The Scent of Green Papaya by Tran Anh Hung
Caméra d'Or – Special Mention: Friends by Elaine Proctor
Short films
Short Film Palme d'Or: Coffee and Cigarettes by Jim Jarmusch

Independent awards
FIPRESCI Prizes
Farewell My Concubine by Chen Kaige (In competition)
Child Murders (Gyerekgyilkosságok) by Ildikó Szabó (Directors' Fortnight)
Commission Supérieure Technique
 Technical Grand Prize: Jean Gargonne, Vincent Arnardi (for technical achievements in images and sound) in Mazeppa
 Special Mention: Grant Lahood (for technical achievements in images and sound) in  The Singing Trophy
Ecumenical Jury
 Prize of the Ecumenical Jury: Libera me by Alain Cavalier
 Ecumenical Jury – Special Mention: Il grande cocomero by Francesca Archibugi
Award of the Youth
Foreign Film: La ardilla roja by Julio Médem
French Film: 
Moi Ivan, toi Abraham by Yolande Zauberman
Mùi đu đủ xanh by Tran Anh Hung
Awards in the frame of International Critics' Week
Mercedes-Benz Award: Cronos by Guillermo del Toro
Canal+ Award: The Debt by Bruno de Almeida
Other awards
Un Certain Regard Award: Latcho Drom by Tony Gatlif
Kodak Short Film Award: L'Exposé by Ismaël Ferroukhi

References

Media
INA: Opening of the 1993 Festival (commentary in French)
INA: List of winners of the 1993 festival (commentary in French)

External links

1993 Cannes Film Festival (web.archive)
Official website Retrospective 1993 
Cannes Film Festival Awards for 1993 at Internet Movie Database

Cannes Film Festival, 1993
Cannes Film Festival, 1993
Cannes Film Festival
Cannes
May 1993 events in Europe